Pine Creek is a stream in Roseau County, in the U.S. state of Minnesota.

Log driving on this stream of pine timber accounts for the name.

See also
List of rivers of Minnesota

References

Rivers of Roseau County, Minnesota
Rivers of Minnesota